Zeugma was an ancient Hellenistic era Greek and then Roman city of Commagene; located in modern Gaziantep Province, Turkey. Zeugma Mosaic Museum contains mosaics from the site, and is one of the largest mosaic museums in the world.

History
Zeugma was founded in the early 3rd century BC as the city of Seleucia by Seleucus I Nicator, a Diadochus  (successor) to Alexander the Great and Hellenistic Greek founder of the Seleucid Kingdom, on the site where he had the first bridge over the Euphrates built. In 64 BC, the Roman Republic gained control of the city. Zeugma was of great importance to the Roman Empire as it was located at a strategically important place. Up to 70,000 people lived in the city, and it became a center for the military and commerce for the ancient Romans. In 253 AD, it was destroyed by the Sassanids, but was later rebuilt.

In late antiquity, Zeugma was a diocese of the early Roman church, but the place seems to have been abandoned in the 7th century due to Sassanid Persian and then Arab raids by the Umayyad Caliphate. Arabs lived there temporarily in the Middle Ages. By the 17th century the Ottoman Turkish village of Belkis was built near the ruins.

Preservation 
Initially the site was excavated sporadically, but in 2000, the site would be flooded due to construction of the Birecik Dam. With only a fraction of the site excavated, archeologists feared that many mosaics would be permanently lost.  After reading about it in The New York Times, and with only few months left, American philanthropist David W. Packard donated USD 5 million to fund an emergency excavation of the archeological site, allowing archeologists to preserve the mosaics that would otherwise be inundated by the dam. The mosaics that were excavated were initially stored at the Gaziantep Museum, and are nowadays displayed at the Zeugma Mosaic Museum.

Zeugma has been on the UNESCO World Heritage Site tentative list since 2012. Extant archaeological remains at the site include "the Hellenistic Agora, the Roman Agora, two sanctuaries, the stadium, the theatre, two bathhouses, the Roman legionary base, administrative structures of the Roman legion, the majority of the residential quarters, Hellenistic and Roman city walls, and the East, South and West necropoles."

Three large glass mosaics were discovered at Zeugma in 2014, including one depicting the nine muses.

In February 2020, it was reported that the Zeugma Mosaic Museum attracted a record 340,569 visitors in 2019, according to the Turkish Culture and Tourism Ministry.

Gallery

See also
Birecik Dam Cemetery
Seleucia at the Zeugma
Hasankeyf

References

Further reading 
ICOMOS Heritage at Risk 2001/2002: Zeugma, Turkey, Icomos Heritage at Risk 2001/2002.

 Kennedy, David. The Twin Towns of Zeugma on the Euphrates: Rescue Work and Historical Studies (Journal of Roman Archaeology Supplementary Series). Portsmouth, RI: Journal of Roman Archaeology, 1998.

External links 

 
 "Zeugma, A Roman Town in Anatolia", a short documentary video
 Zeugmaweb.com
 Pictures of the Zeugma site
 Zeugma at Livius.org, article and photos
 BBC: The Secret Treasures of Zeugma
 UWA Classics and Ancient History Research: Zeugma on the Euphrates
 Gaziantep Archaeology Museum
 Some photos from the Zeugma Museum (Gaziantep, Turkey)
 Description of Zeugma on Gaziantep website

Archaeological sites in Southeastern Anatolia
Populated places along the Silk Road
Populated places in ancient Commagene
Ancient Greek archaeological sites in Turkey
Seleucid colonies in Anatolia
Roman fortifications in Cappadocia
Roman legionary fortresses in Turkey
Twin cities
Former populated places in Turkey
History of Gaziantep Province
World Heritage Tentative List for Turkey
Euphrates
Submerged places